Es war die Nacht der ersten Liebe is a German ballad by singer Thomas Anders. It was Thomas Anders' third single, released in 1981.

Track listing
CBS A 1549 7"
 "Es War Die Nacht Der Ersten Liebe" (Daniel David/Daniele Prencipe/Jean Frankfurter) - 4:17
 "Mädchen So Wie Du" (Daniel David/Daniele Prencipe/Renus Gern) - 3:52

References

1981 singles
Thomas Anders songs
1980s ballads
CBS Records singles
1981 songs